Roberts Bank is an undersea bank in the Strait of Georgia on the south side of the estuary of the Fraser River approximately  south of Vancouver, British Columbia, Canada. Located between the South Arm of the Fraser River and Tsawwassen, it is significant as both a transport hub because of the Tsawwassen Ferry Terminal and port because of the Roberts Bank Superport, and as an area with important wetland habitat.  The term properly refers to the shallows offshore from the Superport and wetland.

References

Strait of Georgia
Delta, British Columbia
Landforms of British Columbia
Undersea banks of the Pacific Ocean